Albino Donati (31 March 1902 – 17 July 1972) was a member of the Italian Christian Democracy, and was an Italian Senator from Lombardy. He did not seek for re-election in 1953.

Political career
Donati was a city councillor of Brescia and member of the board of directors of Cariplo. He obtained a landslide victory in 1948, but retired in 1953 to follow his private business.

Role in the Senate

Committee assignments
Committee on Wealth
Legislature I

Electoral history
1948 election for the Italian Senate
Direct mandate for Chiari (65.7%) obtaining the landslide victory required by law (more than 2/3 of votes)

See also
Italian Senate election in Lombardy, 1948

Footnotes

External links

Site

1902 births
Members of the Italian Senate from Lombardy
Christian Democracy (Italy) politicians
20th-century Italian politicians
Members of the Senate of the Republic (Italy)
1972 deaths